Jacob Pettersson Degenaar (1692 – 1 February 1766) was a Swedish pirate. He was active as a privateer in the Baltic Sea during the War of the Austrian Succession. He operated with a French letter of marque. However, since all privateering had been banned by Swedish law at that point, he was technically considered a pirate.

References 
 Jacob Pettersson Degenaar, urn:sbl:17389, Svenskt biografiskt lexikon (art av b. Linden.), hämtad 2017-11-03.

1692 births
1766 deaths
Swedish pirates
Privateers
People of the War of the Austrian Succession
Age of Liberty people
18th-century pirates